Geraldton/Hutchison Lake Water Aerodrome  is located  north of Geraldton, Ontario, Canada.

References

Registered aerodromes in Ontario
Transport in Thunder Bay District
Seaplane bases in Ontario